Paolo Anesi (1697–1773) was an Italian painter of the 18th century, active mainly in painting capriccios and landscapes (vedute) in the style of Giovanni Paolo Pannini.

Biography
Born in Florence, he trained with Giuseppe Bartolomeo Chiari and Bernardino Fergioni. He was admitted to the Accademia di San Luca and to the Congregation of the Virtuosi of the Pantheon (1747).

He collaborated with Paolo Monaldi in a number of works, described as Bambocciata or genre scenes with peasants. Anesi contributed the landscape and architecture. Together they were hired in 1763-1766 by Cardinal Flavio Chigi to decorate his villa outside of Porta Salaria. These frescoes and paintings were removed and sold, and consisted of large canvases depicting:
Landscape with Vista of Borgheto
Fantasy Landscape (Capriccio) of Lazio with dancing figures and river
Vedute of Ariccia
Fantasy Landscape (Capriccio) of Roman Ruins and Figures

Among his pupils was Francesco Zuccarelli. Anesi completed also a Views of Rome series containing both The Colosseum and the Arch of Constantine.

References

External links

18th-century Italian painters
Italian male painters
Painters from Florence
Italian Baroque painters
Rococo painters
1697 births
1773 deaths
18th-century Italian male artists